Caloptilia superbifrontella is a moth of the family Gracillariidae. It is known from Canada (Québec and Nova Scotia) and the United States (including Florida, Kentucky, Maine, Maryland, Michigan, New York, Vermont, Arkansas and West Virginia).

The wingspan is about 11 mm.

The larvae feed on Hamamelis species, including Hamamelis vernalis, Hamamelis virginica and Hamamelis virginiana. They mine the leaves of their host plant. The larva starts as a leaf miner, but later feed externally, rolling the leaf into a cone.

References

External links
Caloptilia at microleps.org
mothphotographersgroup
Bug Guide

superbifrontella
Moths of North America
Moths described in 1860